Transcription factor IIIB 50 kDa subunit (TFIIIB50) also known as b-related factor 2 (BRF-2) is a protein that in humans is encoded by the BRF2 gene.

Function 

This gene encodes one of the multiple subunits of the RNA polymerase III transcription factor complex required for transcription of genes with promoter elements upstream of the initiation site. The product of this gene, a TFIIB-like factor, is directly recruited to the TATA box of polymerase III small nuclear RNA gene promoters through its interaction with the TATA-binding protein.

References

Further reading

External links